Inermocoelotes inermis is a species of funnel-web spider that was first described by Ludwig Carl Christian Koch in 1855.

See also 
 List of Agelenidae species

References

External links 

Inermocoelotes
Spiders of Europe
Spiders described in 1855